The First Generation Company of the Wholesale Electricity Market (OGK-1) was a large Russian company formed by the merger of six electricity generation companies.

History
The company was established in 2005 by merging six power plants into one company.  Before 1 July 2008, about 92% of the company's shares was owned by RAO UES, Russian state-controlled energy holding company.  As a result of the electricity market reform, 43% of shares was transferred to the Federal Grid Company of Russia, 23% to RusHydro, and 34% was distributed to minority shareholders.

On March 17, 2009 the rights under 61,9% of voting shares were transferred to Inter RAO UES for 5 years with the right for extension for the same period. Starting from July 6, 2009 the powers of the sole executive body of OGK-1 were transferred to Inter RAO UES. In 2012, OGK-1 was merged into Inter RAO.

Operations
OGK-1 operates following power stations:

Permskaya GRES – 2,400 MW,
Nizhnevartovskaya GRES – 1,600 MW
Iriklinskaya GRES – 2,430 MW
Kashirskaya GRES - 1,580 MW
Verkhne-Tagilskaya GRES – 1,497 MW
Urengoyskaya GRES - 24 MW.

The installed capacity of these power stations is about 9,500 MW.  This comprises about 5.5% of the generating capacity of RAO UES.

The power output of the OGK-1 power plants in 2006 was around 48 TW.

References

External links

 

Defunct electric power companies of Russia
Companies based in Ulan-Ude
Energy companies established in 2005
Energy companies disestablished in 2012
Inter RAO
Defunct companies of Russia